Jeff Bridges is an American politician serving as a member of the Colorado Senate from the 26th district. Located in Arapahoe County, the district includes parts of Aurora, Englewood, Sheridan, Greenwood Village, Cherry Hills Village, and Littleton. Bridges serves on the Senate Education Committee, Senate Local Government Committee, and Joint Technology Committee.

Early life and education 
Bridges grew up in Colorado and graduated from Arapahoe High School in Centennial. He earned a Bachelor of Arts degree in political science from Kenyon College and a Master of Divinity from Harvard Divinity School.

Career 
Before running for the Colorado House of Representatives, Bridges worked for U.S Senator Ken Salazar. He also worked as the associate vice president of public affairs of the Union Theological Seminary.  

Bridges was first elected to the Colorado House of Representatives in 2016, representing District 3. He was re-elected to the seat in 2018. In 2019, a vacancy committee elected Bridges to State Senator for District 26, after the resignation of Daniel Kagan.

References

External links
Official campaign website
State House website

21st-century American politicians
Living people
Democratic Party members of the Colorado House of Representatives
Year of birth missing (living people)
Harvard Divinity School alumni
People from Centennial, Colorado
Kenyon College alumni
Democratic Party Colorado state senators